Ophisops occidentalis, the western snake-eyed lizard is a species of lizard in the family Lacertidae. It is found in Algeria, Egypt, Libya, Morocco, and Tunisia. Its natural habitats are temperate forest, Mediterranean-type shrubby vegetation, subtropical or tropical dry lowland grassland, and rocky areas. It is threatened by habitat loss.

References

Ophisops
Reptiles described in 1887
Taxa named by George Albert Boulenger
Taxonomy articles created by Polbot